A pellicle is a skin or coating of proteins on the surface of meat, fish or poultry, that allows smoke to better adhere to the surface of the meat during the smoking process. Useful in all smoking applications and with any kind of animal protein, it is best used with fish where the flesh of a fish such as salmon forms a pellicle that will attract more smoke to adhere to it than would be the case if it had not been used.

Pellicle formation
Before cured foods are cold smoked, they can be allowed to air-dry to form a tacky outer layer, known as a pellicle. The pellicle plays a role in producing better smoked products as it acts as a protective barrier for the food and also plays a role in enhancing the flavor and color produced by the smoke.

Most animal proteins can be dried by placing them on racks or by hanging them on hooks or sticks. It is important that air be able to flow around all sides. They should be air-dried uncovered, in the refrigerator or a cool room. To encourage pellicle formation, foods can be placed so that a fan blows air over them.

See also

 List of cooking techniques
 List of smoked foods

References

Smoking (cooking)
Cooking techniques
Culinary terminology